Wawa Airport  is located  south southwest of Wawa, Ontario, Canada.

References

External links

Registered aerodromes in Algoma District